In order theory, a branch of mathematics, a semiorder is a type of ordering for items with numerical scores, where items with widely differing scores are compared by their scores and where scores within a given margin of error are deemed incomparable. They generalize strict weak orderings, in which items with equal scores may be tied but there is no margin of error. They are a special case of partial orders and of interval orders, and can be characterized among the partial orders by additional axioms, or by two forbidden four-item suborders.

Utility theory
The original motivation for introducing semiorders was to model human preferences without assuming that incomparability is a transitive relation.

To model this mathematically, suppose that objects are given numerical utility values, by letting  be any utility function that maps the objects to be compared (a set ) to real numbers. Set a numerical threshold (which may be normalized to 1) such that utilities within that threshold of each other are declared incomparable, and define a binary relation  on the objects, by setting  whenever . Then  forms a semiorder.
If, instead, objects are declared comparable whenever their utilities differ, the result would be a strict weak ordering, for which incomparability of objects (based on equality of numbers) would be transitive.

Axiomatics

A semiorder, defined from a utility function as above, is a partially ordered set with the following two properties:
Therefore, it is impossible to have two mutually incomparable two-point linear orders.
So it is impossible to have a three-point linear order with a fourth incomparable point.

Conversely, every finite partial order that avoids the two forbidden four-point orderings described above can be given utility values making it into a semiorder.
 Therefore, rather than being a consequence of a definition in terms of utility, these forbidden orderings, or equivalent systems of axioms, can be taken as a combinatorial definition of semiorders.

For orderings on infinite sets of elements, the orderings that can be defined by utility functions and the orderings that can be defined by forbidden four-point orders differ from each other. For instance, if a semiorder  (as defined by forbidden orders) includes an uncountable totally ordered subset then there do not exist sufficiently many sufficiently well-spaced real-numbers for it to be representable by a utility function.  supplies a precise characterization of the semiorders that may be defined numerically.

Relation to other kinds of order

Partial orders
Of the axioms that a partial order is required to obey, reflexivity follows automatically from this definition. Antisymmetry (if  and  then ) follows from the first semiorder axiom. Transitivity (if  and  then ) follows from the second semiorder axiom. Therefore, the binary relation  defined in this way meets the three requirements of a partial order that it be reflexive, antisymmetric, and transitive.

Conversely, suppose that  is a partial order that has been constructed in this way from a semiorder. Not every partial order leads to a semiorder in this way, however: The first of the semiorder axioms listed above follows automatically from the axioms defining a partial order, but the others do not. A partial order that includes four elements forming two two-element chains would lead to a relation  that violates the second semiorder axiom,
and a partial order that includes four elements forming a three-element chain and an unrelated item would violate the third semiorder axiom (cf. pictures in section #Axiomatics).

Weak orders
Every strict weak ordering < is also a semi-order. More particularly, transitivity of < and transitivity of incomparability with respect to < together imply the above axiom 2, while transitivity of incomparability alone implies axiom 3. The semiorder shown in the top image is not a strict weak ordering, since the rightmost vertex is incomparable to its two closest left neighbors, but they are comparable.

Interval orders
The semiorder defined from a utility function  may equivalently be defined as the interval order defined by the intervals , so every semiorder is an example of an interval order.
A relation is a semiorder if, and only if, it can be obtained as an interval order of unit length intervals .

Quasitransitive relations
According to Amartya K. Sen, semi-orders were examined by Dean T. Jamison and Lawrence J. Lau and found to be a special case of quasitransitive relations. In fact, every semiorder is quasitransitive, and quasitransitivity is invariant to adding all pairs of incomparable items. Removing all non-vertical red lines from the topmost image results in a Hasse diagram for a relation that is still quasitransitive, but violates both axiom 2 and 3; this relation might no longer be useful as a preference ordering.

Combinatorial enumeration
The number of distinct semiorders on  unlabeled items is given by the Catalan numbers

while the number of semiorders on  labeled items is given by the sequence

Other results
Any finite semiorder has order dimension at most three.

Among all partial orders with a fixed number of elements and a fixed number of comparable pairs, the partial orders that have the largest number of linear extensions are semiorders.

The set of semiorders on an -element set is well-graded: if two semiorders on the same set differ from each other by the addition or removal of  order relations, then it is possible to find a path of  steps from the first semiorder to the second one, in such a way that each step of the path adds or removes a single order relation and each intermediate state in the path is itself a semiorder.

The incomparability graphs of semiorders are called indifference graphs, and are a special case of the interval graphs.

Notes

References

.
.
.
.
.
.
.
.
.
. Presented at the World Economics Congress, Cambridge, Sep 1970.
.
.
.
.
.
.
.
.

Further reading

 .

Binary relations
Order theory